MV Algocape was a Canadian lake freighter operated by Algoma Central Corp. Initially constructed for Canada Steamship Lines as Richelieu, the ship was sold to Algoma Central Corp in 2004 and renamed Algocape. In 2012, the ship was sold again to Dido Steel Corporation and renamed Goc and broken up for scrap.

Design and description
Algocape had a gross tonnage of 17,822 and a deadweight tonnage of 29,709 tons.

The lake freighter was powered by one  Sulzer 6RD76 6-cylinder marine diesel engine and had a bow thruster.

Service history
Built by Davie Shipbuilding at Lauzon, Quebec, she was launched on November 25, 1966, as Richelieu, for Canada Steamship Lines. The ship was completed in April 1967 and her port of registry was Montreal, Quebec.

In 1971 the registered ownership of the ship passed to Pipe Line Tankers Ltd, however the ship remained registered in Montreal. Her ownership returned to the Canada Steamship Lines in 1984, however her port of registry was switched to Toronto, Ontario.

The freighter was renamed Algocape in 1994, when she was acquired by Algoma Central Corp., taking the name of an earlier vessel which was sold that year to P & H Shipping. Duluth, Minnesota, Thunder Bay, Ontario, Hamilton, Ontario, Sept-Îles, Quebec and Baie-Comeau, Quebec were among her regular ports of call.

In 1995 one of Algocapes lookouts spotted a large package of illicit drugs bobbing in the water near Thorold, Ontario.

In February 2002 Algocapes engines failed, while she was unloading raw sugar at the Redpath Sugar Refinery at the foot of Jarvis Street in Toronto.

In 2012, the ship was sold to Dido Steel Corporation of Freetown, Sierra Leone and renamed Goc. In August 2012 the ship was towed from Montreal to Aliağa, Turkey, and subsequently broken up.

References

Merchant ships of Canada
1966 ships
Great Lakes freighters
Ships built in Quebec
Canada Steamship Lines
Algoma Central Marine